Sphegina hansoni is a species of hoverfly in the family Syrphidae.

Distribution
India.

References

Eristalinae
Insects described in 1966
Diptera of Asia
Taxa named by F. Christian Thompson